This list of Indigenous Australian politicians includes Indigenous Australians who have been members of Australian legislaturesfederal, state or territory. It does not include those elected to local councils (including mayors), Governors/Governors-General, leaders of political parties (outside of parliament), Indigenous Australians actively involved in political institutions and those who have run unsuccessfully for office.

There have been 53 Indigenous members of the ten Australian legislatures, beginning when Neville Bonner entered the Australian Senate on 15 August 1971. Of these, 23 have been elected to the Northern Territory assembly, eleven to the Australian Federal Parliament, six to the parliament of Western Australia, five to the parliament of Queensland, two each to the parliaments of Tasmania, Victoria and New South Wales, and one each to the parliament of South Australia and the Australian Capital Territory assembly. Three have served in multiple parliaments.

Out of the 53 Indigenous Australians elected or appointed to any Australian parliament, 24 have been women.

Nobody of acknowledged Aboriginal or Torres Strait Islander ancestry has yet been a member of the Norfolk Island assembly.

Note: There is considerable debate surrounding the complexity of Indigenous identity. Therefore, this list only includes those who identify themselves as Indigenous Australian. Also note that "origin" or "ancestry" refers to the Indigenous groups, communities, countries, place names or languages which that person identifies with. Some individuals do not have any specific Indigenous group identity and some have multiple identities.

Federal Parliament
Fifteen Indigenous Australian people have been members of the Parliament of Australia (the Federal Parliament), eleven in the Senate and four in the House of Representatives. Ten of them are in it today.

At least four other members of the Federal Parliament have acknowledged Indigenous ancestry, but are or were not generally regarded as Indigenous themselves.

Timeline

Parliament of the Australian Capital Territory
One Indigenous Australian person has been a member of the unicameral Australian Capital Territory Legislative Assembly.

Parliament of New South Wales
Two Indigenous Australians have been a members of the Parliament of New South Wales.

At least two other members of the Parliament of New South Wales have acknowledged Indigenous ancestry, but are not generally regarded as Indigenous themselves.

Parliament of the Northern Territory
Twenty-three Indigenous Australian people have been members of the unicameral Parliament of the Northern Territory.

Parliament of Queensland
Five Indigenous Australian people have been members of the unicameral Parliament of Queensland.

Parliament of South Australia
One Indigenous Australian person has been a member of the Parliament of South Australia.

Parliament of Tasmania
Two Indigenous Australian people have been a member of the Parliament of Tasmania.

At least one other member of the Parliament of Tasmania has acknowledged Indigenous ancestry, but is not generally regarded as Indigenous themself.

Parliament of Victoria

Two Indigenous Australian people have been members of the Parliament of Victoria.

At least two members have had acknowledged Indigenous ancestry, but were not generally regarded as Indigenous themselves.

Parliament of Western Australia
Four Indigenous Australian people have been members of the Parliament of Western Australia, all of whom were elected to the Legislative Assembly until Rosetta Sahanna was elected to the Legislative Council in 2021.

At least one other member of the Parliament of Western Australia has acknowledged Indigenous ancestry, but is not generally regarded as Indigenous themself.

Notable unsuccessful candidates
Many Indigenous Australians have also stood unsuccessfully for office. This is a list of other notable Indigenous Australians to have run in state, territory or federal elections.

See also
 List of Asian Australian politicians
 List of Indigenous Australians in politics and public service
 Māori politics
 Uluru Statement from the Heart

References

Indigenous
 
Indig